The  is a river which flows through the west side of central Tokyo, Japan in an area known as the Musashino Terrace.

The source of the river is associated with the Ohike Pond in the gardens of the Hitachi Central Research Laboratory  just west of Kokubunji Station in the city of Kokubunji. It flows south and then east (receiving water from springs in the adjacent Tonogayato Garden). Having entered  Fuchu it then proceeds in an south-easterly direction through the cities of Koganei, Mitaka and Chofu. From Chofu it briefly enters Komae City before crossing into the special ward of Setagaya from where it finally empties into the Tama River close to Futakotamagawa Station. The confluence point is near to the parallel bridges carrying national route 246 and the Tōkyū Den-en-toshi Line/Tōkyū Ōimachi Line over the Tama River. 

The Nogawa has a total length of 21 km. Its basin is considered to extend to 69.6 km²  including the drainage of its tributaries, the longest of which is the Sen River (Sengawa).

The Nogawa flows through or adjacent to several well known parks including Musashino Park and Nogawa Park in its upper reaches   and Kitami Friendship Square in Setagaya.

Coordinates

River source: 

Confluence with Tama River:

Access

The Nogawa riverside may be accessed from numerous rail stations along its course including

 Kokubunji
 Shin-Koganei
 Tama
 Shibasaki
 Kitami
 Futakotamagawa

References

Rivers of Tokyo
Rivers of Japan